Małujowice  is a village in the administrative district of Gmina Skarbimierz, within Brzeg County, Opole Voivodeship, in south-western Poland.

The village was first mentioned in 1288 as Malewicz. 
The village has an approximate population of 430.

Battle of Mollwitz
The Prussians reached the vicinity of Mollwitz on April 10, 1741 in the midst of a snowstorm. Despite the bad weather, the 20,000-strong Prussian army, consisting of 31 battalions, 35 squadrons and 60 guns, advanced in five columns towards Mollwitz. The Austrian Wilhelm Reinhard von Neipperg also had 20,000 men distributed in 18 battalions, 86 squadrons and 18 guns. He opened fire at one Prussian Artillery in the afternoon, causing embarrassment for the Austrians. An hour later, 4,500 cavalry and six Austrian regiments changed position to avoid the enemy's zone of fire and attack the Prussian right wing. This wing had to withdraw, the cavalry fled and even the counterattack of the 11th Cuirassier Regiment with the king himself at the fore failed. The fire of the Prussian infantry, especially from the grenadier battalions, managed to stop the attack of the Austrian cavalry, in which their commander was killed.

At that critical moment the king left the battlefield at the request of his marshal Kurt Christoph von Schwerin , who wanted to save the monarch's life, and headed for Oppeln (now Opole ), but this town had already been occupied by the enemy. So at midnight he rode back to Mollwitz and was told on the way that the battle had been won. As the Austrian cavalry began to withdraw, the Prussian infantry advanced with fixed bayonets and swinging drums under the command of Schwerin himself, which was decisive for the victory.

The Austrians lost 5,340 men, the Prussians 5,500. Other sources list 4,500 and 4,900 casualties, respectively.

References

Villages in Brzeg County